James "Super Chikan" Johnson is an American blues musician, based in Clarksdale, Mississippi.  He is the nephew of fellow blues musician Big Jack Johnson.

One commentator noted that Super Chikan, Big Jack Johnson, Booba Barnes, R. L. Burnside, and Paul "Wine" Jones were "present-day exponents of an edgier, electrified version of the raw, uncut Delta blues sound."

Life and career

Early life
Super Chikan was born James Johnson in Darling, Mississippi on February 16, 1951. He spent his childhood moving from town to town in the Mississippi Delta and working on his family's farms. He was fond of the chickens on the farm, and before he was old enough to work in the fields, he would walk around talking to them.  This led his friends to give him the nickname "Chikan Boy". At an early age, Johnson got his first rudimentary musical instrument, a diddley bow.  As he grew up, he came up with new ways to improve and vary the sounds he could make with it, and in 1964, at the age of thirteen, he bought his first guitar, an acoustic model that had only two strings, from a Salvation Army store in Clarksdale.

Musical career
As an adult, Super Chikan began driving a truck for a living.  During the long stretches on the road, he began composing his own songs.  When he showed some of the songs to his friends, they convinced him to go to a recording studio and record them.  He then started playing with some renowned local musicians, but he decided he would rather perform on his own than try to conform his style to that of his bandmates. He did so, and in 1997 he released his debut album, Blues Come Home to Roost, influenced by such musicians as Muddy Waters, John Lee Hooker, and Chuck Berry. He went on to release What You See (2000), Shoot That Thang (2001), Chikan Supe (2005), and Sum Mo Chikan (2007).  In the Clarksdale area, he is probably best known for performing regularly at Morgan Freeman's Ground Zero blues club and for being Freeman's favorite blues performer. He also played support to Steven Seagal's band, Thunderbox.

Super Chikan's latest release was Chikadelic, which was distributed by BluesTown Records. It was recorded in Notodden, Norway's Juke Joint Studios, and was released at the 2009 Notodden Blues Festival. Super Chikan was backed by Norway's Spoonful of Blues. In 2011, he was honored with a plaque on the Clarksdale Walk of Fame.

Discography
1997 – Blues Come Home to Roost
2000 – What You See
2001 – Shoot That Thang
2005 – Chikan Supe
2007 – Sum Mo Chikan (Producers and Mixers: Charley Burch and Lawrence "Boo" Mitchell)
2009 – Chikadelic  Winner of 2010 BMA Traditional Blues Album of The Year
2010 – Welcome to Sunny Bluesville
2011 – Okiesippi Blues – Watermelon Slim and Super Chikan (Producers and Mixers: Charley Burch and Lawrence "Boo" Mitchell)
2015 – Organic Chikan, Free Range Rooster (producer James Johnson)

Awards
Living Blues Critics Award (5)
1998 – W. C. Handy Award Nominee
2004 – Mississippi Governor's Award for Excellence in the Arts
2010 – Blues Music Award Winner, Traditional Blues Album of the Year

References

Sources for Sum Mo Chikan 
1. Liner notes on album
3. Royal Studios records and logs located in Memphis, Tennessee.

Sources for Chikadelic
1. Liner notes on album
2. Memphis and Shelby County Music Commission 
3. Juke Joint Studios records and logs located in Notodden, Norway

Sources on Okiesippi Blues
1. Liner notes on album
2. Record label website
3. Royal Studios records and logs located in Memphis, Tennessee.

External links
Super Chikan's Homepage
Official Myspace page
Agent/Management page

1951 births
Living people
American blues singers
American blues guitarists
American male guitarists
Blues musicians from Mississippi
Musicians from Clarksdale, Mississippi
Fat Possum Records artists
American luthiers
Guitar makers
Guitarists from Mississippi
20th-century American guitarists
African-American guitarists
20th-century African-American male singers
21st-century African-American male singers